This is a list of the busiest railway stations in Russia sorted by the average number of passengers boarding daily in 2019, statistics and data are collected by Russian Railways. Ridership numbers are for Russian Railways only, other rail transport like subway, and stations of Crimea Railway are not included.

List
Train stations with more than 2.5 million passengers per year are shown.

References

 
Busiest railway stations in Russia